The Mukden Arsenal Mauser also known as the Model 13 Mauser and Liao Type 13 was a rifle that implemented characteristics of both the Mauser Type 4 and the Arisaka rifles. They were mostly built in the Mukden arsenal in Manchukuo.

History

Origin
Œ.W.G. continued improvement of its Steyr Model 1912 Mauser export rifle after 1912 and during the World War I, finalizing a prototype with a shrouded firing pin, shrouded striker, two gas vent holes, detachable box magazine, and a receiver dust cover in 1917, taking a lot of influence from Japanese Type 38 rifle itself derived from Mauser. However before the war end the production of Mannlicher M1895s for the Austro-Hungarian Army was prioritized for obvious reasons, and in 1919 the peace treaty prohibited military arms production in Austria. So Steyr sold a license to a customer in the Far East, which got rid of the detachable box magazine. It has also been suggested that incomplete guns were imported from Austria in 1918-1920.

Production
The factory established in Shenyang (later known as Mukden) began producing the rifle around 1924. This date is believed to be the origin of the designation "Type 13" as the Nationalist Chinese calendar begins in 1911. After the Japanese invasion of Manchuria in 1931, rifles continued to be produced in the newly created puppet state of Manchukuo, until the factory switched over to producing Arisaka rifles in 1938. It is estimated that around 140,000 Type 13 rifles were made in total. Most of the weapons are using the 7.92×57mm Mauser cartridge, but about 10,000 were chambered in 6.5×50mmSR Arisaka after in late 1944 the production was restarted again for the Manchukuo Imperial Army. Besides different chamber dimensions, these had a steel block inside the magazine installed in order to shorten it without changing the production technology.

Use
The rifles were originally used by the soldiers of Zhang Zuolin (who established the factory and the production of the rifle) in various battles during the warlord era. 72,679 rifles of this type were captured by the Japanese after the Mukden Incident in 1931. The Manchukuo Imperial Army then began using these rifles, as well as newly produced ones, although by the start of the Second Sino-Japanese War the number of rifles in service is estimated to have been fairly small, most likely due to the standardization program and shift towards Japanese weapons during the 1930s. The collaborationist Inner Mongolian Army of Prince Demchugdongrub, and the later puppet state of Mengjiang, had 10,000 of these rifles as well, received in  1929.

Design detail

Arisaka characteristics
The rifle shared many features with the Arisaka rifle, such as a two-part stock, an ovoid bolt handle, and double-gas escape ports on the receiver. It also had a sliding bolt cover that attached to the bolt, and was removable. Another similarity it had with the Arisaka was the bolt being bored from the rear, in order to allow room for a mainspring, which was fixed in by the use of a large housing.

Mauser characteristics

The rifle's safety is similar to that of the Mauser 1898; however, instead of being threaded, the bolt sleeve is fixed to the bolt by way of lugs. The rifle has a pistol grip stock, but with no grasping grooves. Its upper handguard runs from the receiver ring to the lower band. The upper and lower bands are both thinner than on a Mauser, and there is a parade hook for the upper band. The nose cap of the rifle has a short H bayonet lug, so only a bayonet with a muzzle ring can be fitted to it. The lower barrel band has a swivel, and there is a quick-release sling fitting behind the stock's pistol grip.

Specifications
It was made mostly to fire 7.92x57mm (Mauser) bullets; however, some were modified to hold 6.5x50mm (Arisaka) bullets, those that were modified to fire 6.5x50mm bullets were given an auxiliary block in the back of the magazine well in order to compensate for the size difference of the cartridges. The rifle had a left handed 4-groove rifling. The top of the receiver ring was marked with the symbol of the Mukden arsenal, and the serial number of the gun was placed on the left side of the receiver ring.

See Also
Chiang Kai-shek rifle

References

Rifles of Manchukuo
Mauser rifles
7.92×57mm Mauser rifles